This article lists political parties in Lithuania. 
Lithuania has a multi-party system with numerous political parties, in which no one party often has a chance of gaining power alone, and parties must work with each other to form coalition governments. , there are 29 political parties registered with the Ministry of Justice, 2 of them in the process of being deregistered.

Major parties

Current parties in the parliament
There are currently ten parties represented in the Seimas. The current government is a broad majority coalition of the Homeland Union - Lithuanian Christian Democrats, Liberal Movement and Freedom Party.

Parties without parliamentary representation
 Lithuanian People's Party (Lietuvos Liaudies Partija)
 Christian Union (Krikščionių Sąjunga)
 Lithuanian Centre Party - Nationalists (Centro partija – Tautininkai)
 Lithuanian Nationalist and Republican Union (Lietuvių tautininkų ir respublikonų sąjunga)
 Young Lithuania (Jaunoji Lietuva)
 The Way of Courage (Drąsos kelias)
 Samogitian Party (Žemaičių partija, Samogitian: Žemaitiu partėjė)
 Lithuanian List (Lietuvos sąrašas)
 Russian Alliance (Rusų aljansas)
 Union of Fighters for Lithuania (Kovotojų už Lietuvą sąjunga)
 Union of Intergenerational Solidarity - Cohesion for Lithuania (Kartų solidarumo sąjunga - Santalka Lietuvai)
 Lithuania - For everyone (Lietuva - Visų)
 Lithuanian Party of Christian Democracy (Lietuvos krikščioniškosios demokratijos sąjunga)
 National Alliance (Nacionalinis susivienijimas)
 Centre of Trade Unions (Profesinių sąjungų centras)

Defunct and unregistered parties
 Civic Democratic Party (Pilietinės demokratijos partija)
 Centre Union of Lithuania (Lietuvos centro sąjunga)
 Liberal and Centre Union (Lietuvos liberalų ir centro sąjunga)
 Christian Conservative Social Union (Krikščionių konservatorių socialinė sąjunga)
 Democratic Labour Party of Lithuania (Lietuvos demokratinė darbo partija)
 Front (Frontas)
 Christian Democratic Union (Krikščionių demokratų sąjunga)
 Liberal Union of Lithuania (Lietuvos liberalų sąjunga) 
 Lithuanian Christian Democrats (Lietuvos krikščionys demokratai)
 Lithuanian Union of Political Prisoners and Deportees (Lietuvos politinių kalinių ir tremtinių sąjunga)
 Lithuanian Peasants Party (Lietuvos valstiečių partija)
 Modern Christian-Democratic Union (Moderniųjų krikščionių demokratų sąjunga)
 National Resurrection Party (Tautos prisikėlimo partija)
 New Democracy Party (Naujosios demokratijos partija)
 New Union (Social Liberals) (Naujoji Sąjunga (Socialliberalai))
 Socialist Party of Lithuania (Lietuvos socialistų partija)
Lithuanian Freedom Union (Liberals) (Lietuvos Laisvės Sąjunga (Liberalai))
 Socialist People's Front (Socialistinis liaudies frontas)
 Dawn of Justice (Teisingumo Aušra)

Historical parties
 Lithuanian Democratic Party
 Lithuanian Popular Socialist Democratic Party
 Lithuanian Peasants' Union 
 Lithuanian Christian Democratic Party
 Democratic National Freedom League
 Farmers Party
 Communist Party of Lithuania

See also
 Politics of Lithuania
 List of political parties by country
 Liberalism in Lithuania

References

Lithuania
 
Political parties
Lithuania
Political parties